Episannina flavicincta is a moth of the family Sesiidae. It is known from Ghana.

References

Endemic fauna of Ghana
Sesiidae
Insects of West Africa
Moths of Africa